The Aqueduct of Diocletian is an ancient Roman aqueduct near Split, Croatia constructed during the Roman Empire to supply water to the palace of the emperor Diocletian, who was Augustus 284 to 305 AD, retired to Spalatum, and died there in 311.

Description

The Aqueduct of Diocletian was constructed between the end of 3rd and beginning of the 4th century AD, at the same time as the palace.

The aqueduct took water from the river Jadro, 9 kilometres northeast of Diocletian's Palace, today Split's city centre, and brought water to the Palace over a height difference of 13 m. Another aqueduct took water from the same source to Salona.

The aqueduct was destroyed in the invasion of Goths in the middle of 6th century and did not work for thirteen centuries after that.

The first reconstruction of the aqueduct took place during the reign of the Austro-Hungarian Empire (1877–1880). The Diocletianic aqueduct was abandoned in 1932, when the modern water station was built in Kopilica, a peripheral area of Split. The best-preserved part of the aqueduct near Dujmovača (Solin) has a maximum height of 16.5 m and a length of 180 m. The aqueduct is currently being restored.

See also
List of aqueducts in the Roman Empire
List of Roman aqueducts by date
Ancient Roman technology
Roman engineering

References

 Joško Belamarić: Dioklecijanov akvedukt, Ministarstvo kulture Republike Hrvatske, Uprava za zaštitu kulturne baštine, Konzervatorski odjel, 1999. Split, .

External links
  Dal-koning d.o.o.: Konzervatorski elaborat zaštite i obnove Dioklecijanovog akvedukta na lokaciji Brodarica-istok  
 Vjesnik, Mira Jurković: Hrvatski kandidati za Unescovu listu svjetske baštine: Dioklecijanov akvedukt i starogradski ager 

Archaeological sites in Croatia
Aqueducts in Croatia
Buildings and structures in Split, Croatia
Roman aqueducts outside Rome
Tourist attractions in Split